Basket Club Terreur (in English: Terror Basketball Club) is a Congolese basketball club based in Kinshasa. Founded in 1963, they play in the Liprobakin of Kinshasa. The team made its debut in the Africa Basketball League in the 2018–19 season. Terreur lost all three games, finishing last in the group.

Terreur has won one Congolese national championship (in 1992), and four Liprobakin titles (1992, 2014, 2020, and 2022).

Honours

Domestic 
Coupe du Congo

 Champion (1): 1992
 Runners-up (3): 2017, 2018, 2022

Regional 
Liprobakin

 Champion (4): 1992, 2014, 2020, 2022

In African competitions
FIBA Africa Basketball League  (1 appearances)
2018–19 – Group Stage (0–3)

References

External links
Terreur Kinshasa at Afrobasket.com

Basketball teams in the Democratic Republic of the Congo
Sport in Kinshasa
Basketball teams established in 1963